The University of Colorado Colorado Springs (UCCS) is a public research university in Colorado Springs, Colorado. It is one of four campuses that make up the University of Colorado system. As of Fall 2017, UCCS had over 12,400 undergraduate and 1,822 graduate students, with 32% ethnic minority students. It is classified among "R2: Doctoral Universities – High research activity".

History
The campus history begins with the creation of Cragmor Sanatorium, which is now Main Hall.  In 1902, William Jackson Palmer donated funds to build a sanatorium (a place for treatment, rehabilitation, and therapy for the chronically ill).  The Cragmor Sanatorium opened in 1905 and was nicknamed the "Sun Palace" due to its sun-loving architecture.  In the following decades, it developed a following among the cultural elite, and many of its patients were wealthy.  However, they were hit hard by the Great Depression in the 1930s and Cragmor suffered from financial distress into the 1940s.  It was briefly reinvigorated in the 1950s when a contract with the Bureau of Indian Affairs established Cragmor as a treatment center for Navajos with tuberculosis.  About ten years later, the Navajo patients were transferred elsewhere.

As early as 1945, the University of Colorado offered classes in the Colorado Springs area at various locations, mostly Colorado College. By the 1960s, however, a permanent campus was desired.

On February 16, 1961, the Committee for the Expansion of the University of Colorado was formed. The co-chairmen were Joseph Petta and Ronald B Macintyre. Members included Angelo Christopher, Clint Cole, Albert Hesse, Don King, Don Kopis, Rosemary Macintyre, Dorothy Petta, Harrington Richardson, Joseph Reich, Robin Tibbets, Mike Valliant, Phyllis Warner, and John Whigham. (These Co-founders are all honored on a plaque in the lobby of the current campus site.) On March 4, 1961, they submitted a resolution to expand the extension of The University of Colorado to Colorado Springs.  Legislators were favorable. After several more years of local and state meetings in June 1964, the next phase of UCCS's development came about when Dr. George Dwire, the executive director of the Cragmor Sanatorium, began formal actions necessary to transfer the assets of the Cragmoor Corporation to the University of Colorado. The solution came when George T. Dwire sold the Cragmor Sanatorium property for $1 to the state, which became the property of the University of Colorado in 1964.

In 1965, UCCS moved to its current location on Austin Bluffs Parkway in the Cragmor neighborhood of Northern Colorado Springs. The campus is located at one of the highest parts of the city.

Because of its ties to Hewlett-Packard, initial university programs focused on engineering and business, and classes were held in the Cragmor Sanatorium building, what is now Main Hall, and Cragmor Hall, a modern expansion of Main Hall. The first building built exclusively for UCCS, Dwire Hall, was not complete until 1972.

A 1997 community referendum merged Beth-El College of Nursing with UCCS. In recent years, programs such as the Network Information and Space Security Center were added to connect the university with the military to improve national security. Other programs, including the CU Institute for Bioenergetics and the Institute for Science and Space Studies, cast an eye toward the future.

In 2001, UCCS purchased an  building at the corner of Union and Austin Bluffs to house the Beth-El College of Nursing.

Academics

College of Letters, Art & Sciences
The College of Letters, Arts & Sciences is the UCCS college of liberal arts and sciences. The College of LAS gives access to accelerated bachelor's degrees, and three Ph.D. degrees through the seventeen departments at UCCS.

Helen and Arthur E. Johnson Beth-El College of Nursing and Health Sciences
The Helen and Arthur E. Johnson Beth-El College of Nursing and Health Sciences is the UCCS nursing school. It has two departments: Health Sciences and Nursing. The college is accredited with the Colorado State Board of Nursing and the Commission on Collegiate Nursing Education. Both departments are primarily located in University Hall, roughly half a mile east from the main campus at the intersection of Austin Bluffs Parkway and Union Boulevard. intersection.

College of Business and Administration
The College of Business and Administration is the UCCS business school and is located in Dwire Hall. The college was established in 1965. It is accredited by the Association to Advance Collegiate Schools of Business.

College of Education
The College of Education is the UCCS school of education. The College of Education was previously located in Columbine Hall on the UCCS campus; it has since relocated to University Hall down at the intersection of Austin Bluffs Parkway and Union Boulevard. It is accredited by the Council for the Accreditation of Educator Preparation (CAPE), the Colorado Department of Education (CDE), the Colorado Commission on Higher Education (CCHE) and the Council for Accreditation of Counseling and Related Educational Programs (CACREP). It is primarily a Colorado state educator licensure program.

School of Public Affairs
The School of Public Affairs offers degrees in criminal justice and public administration. UCCS SPA is located in the Academic Office Building on the UCCS Campus. UCCS School of Public Affairs offers the only Master of Public Administration NASPAA (Network of Schools of Public Policy, Affairs, and Administration) accredited program in the Pikes Peak Region.

College of Engineering and Applied Science
The College of Engineering and Applied Science is the UCCS engineering college. In the U.S. News & World Report "America’s Best Colleges," the 2008 college rankings edition, "the magazine’s editors ranked the UCCS undergraduate engineering program ninth in the nation among public engineering schools offering bachelor’s or master’s degrees."

UCCS College of Engineering and Applied Science consists of three departments: the Department of Computer Science (computer science); the Department of Electrical and Computer Engineering (electrical engineering, computer engineering), and the Department of Mechanical and Aerospace Engineering (mechanical engineering, aerospace engineering). The college is accredited by the Accreditation Board for Engineering and Technology (ABET). In conjunction with the College of Business it offers the unique Bachelor of Innovation which won the 2008 ASEE new program innovation award.

Thanks to the college's proximity to U.S. government and military installations and the technology private sector, the college has partnerships with several institutions, including defense contractors and semiconductor manufacturers (Intel, Boeing, Agilent, Northrop Grumman, Lockheed Martin), United States Department of Energy National Laboratories (Los Alamos and Sandia), and the military (United States Northern Command, Air Force Space Command, and the United States Air Force Academy).

The college makes use of two buildings on campus:
The Engineering Building houses the Department of Computer Science, Department of Electrical and Computer Engineering, dean's office, Advanced Development and UNIX Laboratory, Specialized Software Development Laboratory, Software Development Laboratory, Communications and Signal Processing Laboratory, Control Systems Laboratory, Electronics Laboratory, Electromagnetics Laboratory, Microelectronics Research Laboratories (MRL), and VLSI Circuit Design Laboratory.
In 2009 a $56.1-million Science and Engineering Building was completed at the center of campus to add needed laboratory and lecture space for the Department of Mechanical and Aerospace Engineering as well as the Physics, Chemistry, and Biology departments. It holds an expanded computer, wind tunnel, fluids, instrumentation, and other mechanical engineering laboratories with an enlarged machine shop and research space, design studios with payload and project areas.  The building was later named Osborne Center for Science and Engineering after its most significant donors, Ed and Mary Osborne.

Institutes

El Pomar Institute for Innovation and Commercialization 
University of Colorado's El Pomar Institute for Innovation and Commercialization (EPIIC)  is located on the campus of the University of Colorado at Colorado Springs (UCCS).

National Institute for Science, Space and Security Centers
The National Institute for Science, Space and Security Centers (NISSSC) is a multi-disciplinary institute. The NISSSC includes the Center for Homeland Security (CHS); the Center for Space Studies (CSS); the Center for Science, Technology, Engineering & Mathematics Education (CSTEME); and the Trauma, Health & Hazards Center (THHC).

Center for Space Studies
The Center for Space Studies (CSS) is an educational and research & development organization formed under affiliation with UCCS and the NISSSC.  Founded in 2004, the center's mission is to promote research, education and outreach in the domain of space technology. The CSS is led by Dr. Scott Trimboli, associate dean of the College of Engineering and Applied Science at UCCS. CSS is located in Colorado Springs, Colorado.

Research
The Center for Space Studies projects include:
Satellite Thermal Modeling for FalconSAT (Dr. Andrew Ketsdever)
Tethered Satellite Orbit Determination (Dr. Steven Tragesser)
Emergency Response Operations System Integration (Dr. Roger Sambrook)
Terahertz Technology for Multiphase Flow Applications (Dr. Andrew Ketsdever & Dr. Hoyoung Song)
Small Satellite Simulator Development  (Dr. Scott Trimboli)

Center for STEM Education

Buildings

Ent Center (2018) - Home to the Visual and Performing Arts classes. Also hosts some events for the students, and also is sometimes used by the Colorado Springs Philharmonic orchestra.
Main Hall (1914) – Administration building containing the Bursar's office, admissions, student success center, etc.
Cragmor Hall (1959) – Administration building containing orientation rooms, student recruitment, counseling, and financial aid.
Dwire Hall (1972) – Renovated from 2006 to 2007, it serves as the building for classes in business, economics, languages and cultures, and film studies.
The El Pomar Center (1975) – Home to the Kraemer Family Library and technical support. Renovated at the beginning of the millennium to expand the library and add the University Center.
Engineering and Applied Sciences (1985) – Serves as the building for engineering, math, and science classes. It is currently undergoing a massive expansion.
Campus Services (1996)
Columbine Hall (1997) – The new home for most LAS classes, also containing writing center, communications lab, and a lecture hall.
Summit Village (1997) – This is the first of UCCS's student housing, now catering to freshmen only. Divided into Vail, Steamboat, Telluride, Aspen, Keystone, Monarch, and Breckenridge (laundry, computer facilities, and seminar rooms). Summit houses altogether about 800 freshmen.
University Center (2001) – Addition to El Pomar, this is the center of campus life where activities and seminars are held. The information desk, bookstore, newsroom, and campus recreation offices are housed in the lower level. A basketball court and gym will soon to be expanded to include larger facilities for games and a multi-use area to help ease the strain on the facility until permanent facilities near 4-Diamonds are constructed sometime during the mid-twenty-teens.
University Hall (2001) – Building purchased for Beth-El Nursing and other programs.
Services/Campus Police/Health Clinic/Parking Garage (2004)
Alpine Village (2004) – The second village in student housing, Alpine is divided into Shavano, Antero, and Crestone Houses, and caters now to all non-freshmen choosing to live on-campus. Students who live here must access campus via a trail or shuttle.
Campus Recreation Center (2007) – Recently completed, this recreation building for students, replacing the current facilities at the University Center, features a swimming pool, a climbing wall, and a full basketball court, along with the full complement of equipment.
Osborne Center for Science and Engineering (2009) – Formerly the "Science and Engineering Building", renamed in May 2011, this building was designed by AR7 Architects (now NAC Architecture) and provides a twofold expansion of science and engineering classrooms and facilities, and connects via a bridge to the Engineering and Applied Sciences building.
Centennial Hall (2010) – The building was completely gutted and rebuilt inside with the exception of new classrooms added in 2006. Formerly called the Science Building, it was built in 1981 and used for science and anthropology classes along with the student art gallery.
UCCS Events Center (2010) – Money originally allocated to construct a temporary new home for Mountain Lion athletics was instead added to a larger budget to significantly expand the current athletics gym and create a new Events Center, which will, in addition to providing a larger gym for volleyball and basketball, will serve as a venue for conferences and large lectures when completed.  Now the Events Center is called the Gallogly Events Center.
Summit Village Expansion (2013) – Two additional residence halls adjacent to Aspen House.
Alpine Parking Garage & Recreational Field (2014)
Academic Office Building (2014) – Academic office building at the former site of Building 20 on Regent Circle.
Village at Alpine Valley(2016)- Added three residence halls and a new dining hall.

Master plan and future growth 
In 2000, the CU Board of Regents designated UCCS as the CU growth campus. In 2003, the Colorado Legislature approved revisions in the university's statutory role and mission to remove geographic and program restrictions. In 2005, the Regents approved a seven-year plan that calls for the university to add to its base of 7,650 students (Fall 2004), 347 FTE faculty and 254 FTE staff.

The 2006–2012 plan called for growth to 9,100 students with corresponding increases in faculty, staff, programs and campus infrastructure.

In addition to the completion of the recreation center, Dwire Hall renovation, and the third wing of the new science/engineering building, the seven-year plan also calls for the renovation and transition of the old Heller Center on the other side of the bluff that campus sits in front of into a sort of "arts retreat". This project is expected to cost around $4.4 million. Also, by 2014, two new buildings are in the works for Summit, and by that year the Alpine Village should be built out with three additional buildings across from the current ones.

With construction on the new Austin Bluffs/Union interchange, the construction of a new frontage road from campus to University Hall began as well, enabling a closed circuit connecting Cragmor Campus with University Hall, making access to Austin Bluffs unnecessary.

From 2014 a new indoor athletics complex will be constructed along Nevada in the existing 4-Diamonds area. North Nevada is the second phase of campus in the long-term, and extreme long-term build-out calls for dozens of new buildings, academic halls, and another resident village to be built along Nevada.

Slated for completion by the end of 2019, a new road will connect the main campus with the Ent Center for the Arts. This road will bypass Stanton Road running through the Eagle Rock neighborhood.

Athletics

UCCS competes in NCAA Division II in the Rocky Mountain Athletic Conference (RMAC), fielding teams in men's basketball, women's basketball, women's volleyball, men's cross country, women's cross country, men's indoor track and field, women's indoor track and field, men's outdoor track and field, women's outdoor track and field, men's golf, men's soccer, women's soccer, women's softball and women's lacrosse. 

The school mascot is the mountain lion, Clyde, with official colors of gold and black, the same school colors of CU-Boulder (black, gold and silver).

Honor societies
In addition to its honors programs, UCCS has chapters of the following honor societies on campus:

Alpha Kappa Delta (sociology)
Alpha Lambda Delta (freshman)
Alpha Phi Sigma (criminal justice)
Beta Gamma Sigma (business)
Chi Sigma Iota (counseling)
Delta Phi Alpha (German)
Eta Kappa Nu (electrical engineering)
Omicron Delta Epsilon (economics)
Phi Alpha Theta (History)
Pi Alpha Alpha (public affairs)
Pi Delta Phi (French)
Psi Chi (psychology)
Sigma Delta Pi (Hispanic) 
Sigma Tau Delta (English)
Sigma Theta Tau (nursing)

Professional fraternities: Phi Alpha Delta (pre-law) and Delta Sigma Pi (business)

School publications
The official campus newspaper is The Scribe, since 1966.
The university is home to Writers' Forum, a national literary journal founded in 1974.
URJ-UCCS: Undergraduate Research Journal at UCCS
riverrun is the student literary and arts journal published annually. They take poetry, fiction, nonfiction, and visual art submissions. riverrun must never be capitalized because it is a reference to the first word of the book Finnegans Wake, which starts in the middle of a sentence. The beginning of the sentence is at the end of the book.

Notable students, alumni, and staff
Max Aaron  - 2013 U.S. national champion figure skater
Steve Bach (B.S. in business) - former Colorado Springs Mayor, first "Strong Mayor"
Jason Brown - 2015 U.S. national champion figure skater and Olympic bronze medalist 
Teresa A. H. Djuric (M.A. in Curriculum and Instruction, 1994)  - U.S. Air Force Brigadier General
John Herrington (B.A. in mathematics, 1983) - first Native American to go to space, aboard Space Shuttle Endeavour in 2002
Yusef Komunyakaa (B.A. 1975)  - first African-American to win Pulitzer Prize for poetry
Mary Lou Makepeace (M.P.A. 1979) - first female mayor of Colorado Springs, serving from 1997 to 2003
 Charlee Minkin (born 1981), Olympic judoka
John Morse (B.S. in business, M.P.A. 1996) - former president of the Colorado Senate 
Mirai Nagasu - 2008 U.S. national champion figure skater and 2010 Olympian
Apolo Ohno - speed skater, most decorated American Winter Olympic athlete of all time
Raquel Pennington - professional mixed martial arts fighter, competing in the UFC's bantamweight division
Jugal Kalita - Computer Science Professor, Language Information and Computation (LINC) Lab
Garrett Swasey - UCCS police officer who died in the line of duty at age 44 during the Colorado Springs Planned Parenthood shooting
Derrick White - basketball player

International exchange
Dual degree –  Ching Yun University, Taiwan（3–2 programs）

References

External links
 
 UCCS Athletics

 
University of Colorado Colorado Springs
1965 establishments in Colorado
Educational institutions established in 1965
Colorado Springs